A yo-yo (also spelled yoyo) is a toy consisting of an axle connected to two disks, and a string looped around the axle, similar to a spool. It is an ancient toy with proof of existence since 500 BCE. The yo-yo was also called a bandalore in the 17th century.

It is played by holding the free end of the string known as the handle (by inserting one fingerusually the middle or ring fingerinto a slip knot), allowing gravity (or the force of a throw and gravity) to spin the yo-yo and unwind the string (similar to how a pullstring works). The player then allows the yo-yo to wind itself back to the player's hand, exploiting its spin (and the associated rotational energy). This is often called "yo-yoing" or "playing yo-yo".

In the simplest play, the string is intended to be wound on the spool by hand; the yo-yo is thrown downward, hits the end of the string then winds up the string toward the hand, and finally the yo-yo is grabbed, ready to be thrown again. One of the most basic tricks is called the sleeper, where the yo-yo spins at the end of the string for a noticeable amount of time before returning to the hand.

Etymology and history
The word yo probably comes from the Ilocano term yóyo, or a cognate word from the Philippines.

A Greek vase painting from 440 BC shows a boy playing with a yo-yo (see right). Greek records from the period describe toys made out of wood, metal, or painted terra cotta (fired clay). The terra cotta disks were used to ceremonially offer the toys of youth to certain gods when a child came of age—discs of other materials were used for actual play.

First yo-yo company 

In 1928, Pedro Flores, a Filipino immigrant to the United States, opened the Yo-yo Manufacturing Company in Santa Barbara, California. The business started with a dozen handmade toys; by November 1929, Flores was operating two additional factories in Los Angeles and Hollywood, which all together employed 600 workers and produced 300,000 units daily.

The principal distinction between the Filipino design popularized by Flores and more primitive yo-yos is in the way the yo-yo is strung. In older (and some remaining inexpensive) yo-yo designs, the string is tied to the axle using a knot. With this technique, the yo-yo just goes back and forth; it returns easily, but it is impossible to make it sleep. In Flores's design, one continuous piece of string, double the desired length, is twisted around something to produce a loop at one end which is fitted around the axle. Also termed a looped slip-string, this seemingly minor modification allows for a far greater variety and sophistication of motion, thanks to increased stability and suspension of movement during free spin.

Shortly thereafter (c. 1929), entrepreneur Donald F. Duncan recognized the potential of this new fad and purchased the Flores yo-yo Corporation and all its assets, including the Flores name, which was transferred to the new company in 1932.

In 1932, Swedish Kalmartrissan yo-yos started to be manufactured as well.

In 1933 yo-yos were banned in Syria, because many locals superstitiously blamed the use of them for a severe drought.

In 1946, the Duncan Toys Company opened a yo-yo factory in Luck, Wisconsin. The Duncan yo-yo was inducted into the National Toy Hall of Fame at The Strong in Rochester, New York, in 1999.

1960s resurgence 
Declining sales after the Second World War prompted Duncan to launch a comeback campaign for his trademarked "Yo-Yo" in 1962 with a series of television advertisements.

In a trademark case in 1965, a federal court of appeal ruled in favor of the Royal Tops Company, determining that yo-yo had become a part of common speech and that Duncan no longer had exclusive rights to the term. As a result of the expenses incurred by this legal battle as well as other financial pressures, the Duncan family sold the company name and associated trademarks in 1968 to Flambeau, Inc, which had manufactured Duncan's plastic models since 1955. , Flambeau Plastics continued to run the company.

Rise of the ball bearing 
As popularity spread through the 1970s and 1980s, there were a number of innovations in yo-yo technology, primarily regarding the connection between the string and the axle. In 1979, dentist and yo-yo celebrity Tom Kuhn patented the "No Jive 3-in-1" yo-yo, creating the world's first "take-apart" yo-yo, which enabled yo-yo players to change the axle.

Swedish bearing company SKF briefly manufactured novelty yo-yos with ball bearings in 1984. In 1990, Kuhn introduced the SB-2 yo-yo that had an aluminum transaxle, making it the first successful ball-bearing yo-yo.

In all transaxle yo-yos, ball bearings significantly reduce friction when the yo-yo is spinning, enabling longer and more complex tricks. Subsequent yo-yo players used this ability to their advantage, creating new tricks that had not been possible with fixed-axle designs.

There are many new types of ball bearings in the market which deviate from the original design and/or material of the standard stainless steel ball bearing. For example, a certain type of bearing has an inward facing curved surface, to prevent the string from rubbing on the sides of the yo-yo, which would cause unwanted friction when performing intricate string tricks. Other manufacturers replicate this with a similar inwardly curved surface, but use minor modifications. Some high-end bearings use ceramic composites in the balls of the bearing, to reduce internal friction, again making for a smoother spinning yo-yo. Precious materials such as ruby have also been used as a material in prototype ball bearings for its properties such as extreme hardness. The material was first tested in a prototype bearing made by Wolf Yoyo Works in May 2018.

Modern yo-yo 
The era following the yo-yo boom of the late 1990s is often referred to as the "modern" era of yo-yo. The modern era of yo-yo is characterized by markedly more complicated and sophisticated yo-yo techniques than came before in addition to a plethora of different yo-yo designs created to serve various niche purposes. This increased complexity of yo-yo play was allowed by the introduction of the ball-bearing technology to yo-yos, which enabled yo-yos to spin for significantly longer amounts of time than was previously possible. This, in addition to the advent of the bind technique and unresponsive yo-yoing equipped yo-yo players with an essentially limitless amount of freedom, with which they were able to create myriad yo-yo tricks and techniques.

In the wake of this revolution that took place in yo-yo, a landscape of yo-yo competitions tailored towards this modern style of yo-yo play emerged. (See, for example, World Yo-Yo Contest.) Outside of the competition scene, yo-yo players regularly share videos of their yo-yo tricks on the Internet; a common place players do so is on Instagram, using the hashtag "#trickcircle". Some yo-yo players have also found modest success outside the yo-yo community, going viral on TikTok, gaining significant YouTube followings, or being featured guests on television programs.

Techniques

Sleeping 

The sleeper is one of the most common yo-yo throws and is the basis for nearly all yo-yo throws other than looping. Keeping a yo-yo spinning while remaining at the end of its uncoiled string is known as sleeping. While the yo-yo is in the "sleeping" state at the end of the string, one can then execute tricks like "walk the dog", "around the world", or the more complex "rock the baby".

The essence of the throw is that one throws the yo-yo with a very pronounced wrist action so that when the yo-yo reaches the end of the string it spins in place rather than rolling back up the string to the thrower's hand. Most modern yo-yos have a transaxle or ball bearing to assist this, but if it is a fixed axle yo-yo, the tension must be loose enough to allow this. The two main ways to do this are (1), allow the yo-yo to sit at the bottom of the string to unwind, or (2) perform lariat or UFO to loosen the tension. When one decides to end the "sleeping" state, one merely jerks the wrist and the yo-yo "catches" the string and rolls back up to the hand. Ball-bearing yo-yos with a "butterfly" shape, primarily used for string tricks, frequently have low response or are completely unresponsive, requiring a "bind" for the yo-yo to return.

In competition, mastery of sleeping is the basis for the 1A division. Inexpensive fixed-axle yo-yos usually spin between 10 and 20 seconds, while the expensive ball bearing yo-yos can spin about 1–4 minutes depending on the throw. , the world record sleep times were 3:51.54 minutes for fixed-axle and 21:15.17 minutes for transaxle yo-yos. In 2012, the transaxle yo-yo sleep time record was broken by the C3YoyoDesign BTH, with a time of 30:28.30 minutes .

Unresponsive (1A) 

Eventually, wider string gaps and silicone response systems led to the innovation of unresponsive yoyoing, otherwise known as 1A. Traditional yoyos (responsive) would return to the hand when one would tug on the string, but unresponsive yoyos behave a little differently. Instead of returning to the hand when one tugs on the string, one has to perform a trick called a "bind" where the string is doubled over inside the string gap to increase friction on the response system. This has brought about innovation of many different kinds of tricks involving leaving slack in the string, as this would have caused a responsive yoyo to return to the hand. This style of yoyoing is the most popular and the most common, and the most yoyo tricks are done with 1A yoyos.

Looping (2A) 

Looping is a yo-yo technique which emphasizes keeping the body of two yo-yos, one on each hand, in constant motion, with or without sleeping.

Yo-yos optimized for looping have weight concentrated in their centers so they may easily rotate about the string's axis without their mass contributing to resistance due to a gyroscopic effect.

In yo-yo competitions, looping both to the inside and outside of the hand with the yo-yo plays a strong role in the 2A division. Sometimes the yoyos would wrap around arms, legs, or necks.

Also known as two hands looping freestyle.

Two handed string tricks (3A) 
Two handed or 3A style play involves doing string tricks with two flared bearing yo-yos. Popularized and pioneered by Mark McBride, the first modern Triple A trick appeared in Fiend Magazine and was called the Velvet Rolls. The different mounts in this style are referred to as houses (e.g. "Kink House").

Photos from as early as the late 1950s show early yo-yo demonstrators performing very basic 3A tricks, such as a Sleeper with one hand, and a Trapeze with the other. While 3A as a concept has existed for many years, it was not until the debut of Velvet Rolls, coupled with the rise of unresponsive yoyo play, that development began on what is currently considered Triple A. This is the most complex style and is the most likely to obtain knots, dings, and clangs.

In competition, two handed string tricks have the 3A division.

Off-string (4A) 
In the "off-string" technique, the yo-yo's string is not tied directly to the yo-yo's axle, and the yo-yo is usually launched into the air by performing a "forward pass" to be caught again on the string. However, some players can 'throw down' off-string yo-yos and catch it on the string just as it leaves the end of the string by pivoting the string around a finger as it unwinds, so that the yo-yo is caught on the string. This is exactly the opposite of a "forward pass", but with the same result.

Yo-yos optimized for off-string tricks have flared designs, like the butterfly shape, which makes it easier to land on the string, and often have soft rubber rings on the edges, so minimum damage is inflicted on the yo-yo, the player, or anyone who happens to be standing nearby, should a trick go wrong. There are also tricks which involve the use of two off-string yoyos at the same time, thrown with the same hand, this is known as "soloham".

Yo-yo competitions have the 4A division for off-string tricks.

Freehand (5A) 
In freehand tricks, the yo-yo's string is not tied to the player's hand, instead ending in a counterweight. The counterweight is then thrown from hand to hand and used as an additional element in the trick.

Developed in 1999 by Steve Brown, as of 2008 freehand is considered to be the fastest-growing style of yo-yo play. Steve Brown was awarded a patent on his freehand yo-yo system, which was assigned to Flambeau Products (Duncan's parent company). Duncan patented the counterweight, and no one was able to design a unique weight. However, since March 28, 2020, the patent has expired.

In yo-yo competitions, counterweight yo-yos are emphasized in the 5A division.

Physical mechanism 
When the yo-yo is first released, the gravity (and the throw) give it translational kinetic energy and necessarily, since the string must unwind, much of this energy is converted into rotational kinetic energy establishing the free movement of the yo-yo, and causing it to spin rapidly. As the yo-yo unwinds downward, it also converts potential energy from gravity to translational energy in its rotation to overcome gravity all the way back up to the hand.

Because the sense of spinning does not change during the whole move, the string winds up in the opposite direction upon the return of the yo-yo. If the shaft of the yo-yo is connected to the string with a loop, there may not be enough frictional force to overcome the weight of the yo-yo, which is necessary to begin winding up the string. In this case, the yo-yo will continue to spin in the loop at the end of the string (or sleep), just being slightly braked by the small dynamic friction, instead of returning. However, if the string is jerked slightly up, or the hand is lowered, the slack created in the string will allow it to begin winding around the shaft, thereby increasing friction and allowing it to catch as the static friction force rises above the gravitation force holding the yo-yo at the bottom of the string, making the yo-yo wind up the string returning to the hand.

Patents have been issued to create more complicated mechanisms to allow tension control and an adjustable mechanism.

Purported use as weapons 
There is no sound historical evidence that yo-yos were ever used as weapons; the notion is believed to have been a marketing gimmick disseminated by Duncan yo-yo demonstrators in the early years of the company. Regardless, the notion that yo-yos can be used as weapons persists to this day in pop culture, as in the Chinese television series Blazing Teens, and in the Japanese Guilty Gear franchise by the character Bridget (the animation of whose giant yo-yo's movements were a considerable challenge to look natural).

See also 

Chinese yo-yo
Eskimo yo-yo
Yo-yo balloon
Top

References

External links 

Index of yo-yo tricks

Brands that became generic
Circus skills
Physical activity and dexterity toys
Sports entertainment
Tagalog words and phrases
Traditional toys
Wooden toys
 
1930s fads and trends